Events from the year 1999 in Iran.

Incumbents
 Supreme Leader: Ali Khamenei
 President: Mohammad Khatami 
 Vice President: Hassan Habibi
 Chief Justice: Mohammad Yazdii (until 30 June), Mahmoud Hashemi Shahroudi (starting 30 June)

Events

 1999–2000 Iran Football's 2nd Division.

Establishments

 Moderation and Development Party.

Births 
21 September - Mahsa Amini

Deaths 
 13 November - Ibrahim al-Musawi al-Zanjani, Islamic scholar and writer.

See also
 Years in Iraq
 Years in Afghanistan

References

 
Iran
Years of the 20th century in Iran
1990s in Iran
Iran